Aerials (or more commonly airs) are a type of skateboarding trick usually performed on half-pipes, pools or quarter pipes where there is a vertical wall with a transition (curved surface linking wall and ground) available. Aerials usually combine rotation with different grabs. Most of the different types of grabs were originally aerial tricks that were performed in ditches, empty pools, and vert ramps before flatground aerials became common. Aerials can be executed by ollieing just as the front wheels reach the lip of a ramp, or can be executed simply by lifting the front wheels over the coping (or lip). The former is preferable on shallower ramps where the skateboarder has less speed to lift them above the ramp.

Common aerial tricks

Aerial Terminology

References

Skateboarding tricks